The Rego Park Jewish Center (1948) is an Art Deco Streamline Moderne synagogue in the Rego Park neighborhood of Queens, New York City.

The architectural firm of Frank Grad & Sons designed the building.  The facade  features a mosaic by Hungarian-born artist A. Raymond Katz.

It is listed on both the New York State and National Register of Historic Places.

Gallery

External links

Synagogue website

References

Synagogues in Queens, New York
Conservative synagogues in New York City

Properties of religious function on the National Register of Historic Places in Queens, New York
Synagogues on the National Register of Historic Places in New York City
Synagogues completed in 1948
1948 establishments in New York City
Moderne architecture in New York City
Art Deco synagogues
Art Deco architecture in Queens, New York
Streamline Moderne architecture in New York City